Furuhjelm 46, also known as HD 155876 and Gliese 661, is a nearby binary star system, consisting of two very similar red dwarfs, located in the constellation Hercules.

The star's duplicity was discovered by the Dutch astronomer Gerard Kuiper in 1934 in a systematic survey for duplicity of the known stars within about 25 parsecs from the Sun, carried out with the 36-inch telescope of the Lick Observatory. Furuhjelm 46 is the nearest "true" (i. e. not brown dwarf) star system in Hercules, however, there is brown dwarf in this constellation, located closer: WISE 1741+2553.

References

External links
Diagram of orbit from U.S.Naval Obs. site 

Binary stars
Hercules (constellation)
M-type main-sequence stars
0661
155876
084140
Durchmusterung objects